Plants that produce toxins and/or causes irritation on contact are referred to as poisonous plants. 

The toxins in poisonous plants affect herbivores, and deter them from consuming the plants. Plants cannot move to escape their predators, so they must have other means of protecting themselves from herbivorous animals. Some plants have physical defenses such as thorns, spines and prickles, but by far the most common type of protection is chemical.

Over millennia, through the process of natural selection, plants have evolved the means to produce a vast and complicated array of chemical compounds to deter herbivores. Tannin, for example, is a defensive compound that emerged relatively early in the evolutionary history of plants, while more complex molecules such as polyacetylenes are found in younger groups of plants such as the Asterales. Many of the known plant defense compounds primarily defend against consumption by insects, though other animals, including humans, that consume such plants may also experience negative effects, ranging from mild discomfort to death.

Many of these poisonous compounds also have important medicinal benefits. The varieties of phytochemical defenses in plants are so numerous that many questions about them remain unanswered, including:

 Which plants have which types of defense?
 Which herbivores, specifically, are the plants defended against?
 What chemical structures and mechanisms of toxicity are involved in the compounds that provide defense?
 What are the potential medical uses of these compounds?

These questions and others constitute an active area of research in modern botany, with important implications for understanding plant evolution and medical science.

Below is an extensive, if incomplete, list of plants containing one or more poisonous parts that pose a serious risk of illness, injury, or death to humans or domestic animals. There is significant overlap between plants considered poisonous and those with psychotropic properties, some of which are toxic enough to present serious health risks at recreational doses. There is a distinction between plants that are poisonous because they naturally produce dangerous phytochemicals, and those that may become dangerous for other reasons, including but not limited to infection by bacterial, viral, or fungal parasites; the uptake of toxic compounds through contaminated soil or groundwater; and/or the ordinary processes of decay after the plant has died; this list deals exclusively with plants that produce phytochemicals. Many plants, such as peanuts, produce compounds that are only dangerous to people who have developed an allergic reaction to them, and with a few exceptions, those plants are not included here (see list of allergens instead). Despite the wide variety of plants considered poisonous, human fatalities caused by poisonous plants – especially resulting from accidental ingestion – are rare in the developed world.

Poisonous plants that are food 
Many plants commonly used as food possess toxic parts, are toxic unless processed, or are toxic at certain stages of their lives. Some only pose a serious threat to certain animals (such as cats, dogs, or livestock) or certain types of people (such as infants, the elderly, or individuals with pathological vulnerabilities). Most of these food plants are safe for the average adult to eat in modest quantities. Notable examples include:

Other poisonous plants 

Countless other plants not commonly used in food or drink are also poisonous, and care should be taken to avoid accidentally contacting or ingesting them. Some of these are popular ornamental plants or are cultivated for purposes other than consumption.

See also 

List of plants poisonous to equines
List of poisonous fungus species
List of venomous animals
Biopesticide
Mushroom poisoning
Psychoactive plant
Secondary metabolite
Toxin
Weed

References

Bibliography

External links 

US Army: Guide to poisonous and toxic plants
Cornell University Poisonous Plants Information Database po

Poisonous
Poisonous
Poisonous
Toxicology
Hazards of outdoor recreation
Poisonous plants